Ryan G. Bayda (born December 9, 1980) is a Canadian former professional ice hockey left winger who played 179 games in the National Hockey League (NHL).

Playing career
Bayda was drafted in the third round, 80th overall by the Carolina Hurricanes in the 2000 NHL Entry Draft.  He joined the Hurricanes' AHL affiliate the Lowell Lock Monsters at the tailend of the 2001–02 season, scoring a goal and an assist in three regular season games and also scoring three goals in five playoff games.  He made his NHL debut for Carolina during the 2002–03 NHL season. Bayda scored his first career NHL goal against Ed Belfour and the Toronto Maple Leafs on February 18, 2003, in a 4-3 Hurricanes loss.

On July 3, 2007, the Hurricanes re-signed Bayda to a one-year, $475,000 contract, a two-way contract which also paid him $100,000 at the AHL level.

On July 1, 2008, the Hurricanes re-signed Bayda to a one-year, $475,000 contract for the 2008-09 season. Bayda in his first full NHL season, played in a career-high 70 games and helped the Hurricanes reach the Eastern Conference finals. During the finals on May 22, 2009, Bayda was fined $2,500 as a result of a match penalty he was assessed for cross-checking Pittsburgh Penguins defenseman Kris Letang in the chin at the end of game 2 of the Eastern Conference Finals.

On September 3, 2009, Bayda was invited to the St. Louis Blues training camp for the 2009-10 season. Ryan, however, turned down the offer after the Blues signed forward Derek Armstrong and accepted an invitation to the Pittsburgh Penguins training camp instead.

On July 12, 2013, after three seasons with the Nürnberg Ice Tigers of the Deutsche Eishockey Liga (DEL) in Germany, Bayda left as a free agent to join DEL rivals Augsburger Panther on a one-year deal.

In the following 2014–15 season, Bayda was limited to just 6 games, in which he produced 10 points, due to a serious elbow injury. Bayda as seasons end left as a free agent and signed a one-year contract with fellow DEL club, the Straubing Tigers on March 26, 2015.

He retired upon the conclusion of the 2015–16 season with the Straubing Tigers and returned to his home town of Saskatoon, where he opened a tattoo removal business.

Career statistics

Awards and honors

References

External links

1980 births
Living people
Albany River Rats players
Augsburger Panther players
Canadian ice hockey left wingers
Carolina Hurricanes draft picks
Carolina Hurricanes players
Sportspeople from Saskatoon
Lowell Lock Monsters players
Manitoba Moose players
North Dakota Fighting Hawks men's ice hockey players
Ice hockey people from Saskatchewan
Straubing Tigers players
Thomas Sabo Ice Tigers players
Vernon Vipers players
Wilkes-Barre/Scranton Penguins players
Canadian expatriate ice hockey players in Germany
NCAA men's ice hockey national champions